The 1941 Kansas State Wildcats football team was an American football team that represented Kansas State University in Big Six Conference during the 1941 college football season. The team's head football coach was Hobbs Adams, in his second and final year of his first tenure at the helm of the Wildcats. The Wildcats compiled a 2–5–2 record (1–3–1 record in conference play), finished fifth in the conference, and were outscored by a total of 168 to 67. They played their home games in Memorial Stadium in Manhattan, Kansas.

End Frank Barnhart was selected by the United Press as a first-team player on the 1941 All-Big Six Conference football team. Center John Hancock and fullback Lyle Wilkins were named to the second team.

Schedule

References

Kansas State
Kansas State Wildcats football seasons
Kansas State Wildcats football